Mangroves (2003) is a collection of poetry by Australian poet Laurie Duggan. It won the ALS Gold Medal in 2004.

The collection consists of 74 poems, some previously published and some published for the first time in this volume.

The poems in this collections are grouped into two main sections: Part I Mangroves (2000-2002) and Part II The Night Watch (1988-1994). An author's note (p.ix) explains the significance of this grouping.

Contents

Reviews

Writing in Jacket magazine Angela Rockel concluded: "The structure of this collection invites a spiral of readings in which earlier poems are re-experienced in the light of later work, and later work is understood differently in relation to its origins in earlier patterns. Rather than pro- or regression, the shift that occurs in the space between Part II and Part I is imaged as a change in location, and, as for the costumed figures of The Night Watch in the photograph, nothing has changed/ everything has changed. Having found and lost and found again the foothold of writing, Duggan creates a poetic that first of all acknowledges the mutability of things, and within that understanding, asks how dwelling can be found."

David McCooey, in his review in Westerley, had a wider view: "Mangroves is notable for its power, its multiplicity, and its wit.  Humour, as ever, is important to Duggan and Mangoves is enlightened by many great jokes. Mangroves is an ambitious book. It is not only large and varied; but it also takes the idea of poetry to its limits. This is both ambitious and consistent with the condition of poetry."

Awards and nominations 

 2004 — winner ALS Gold Medal

References

2003 books
Australian poetry collections
ALS Gold Medal winning works